Chopra may refer top:

 Chopra (surname) 
 Chopratown, comedy drama from BBC
 Named portions of West Bengal in India:
 Chopra, Uttar Dinajpur, town 
 Chopra (community development block), Uttar Dinajpur district
 Chopra (Vidhan Sabha constituency) (i.e., in the government assembly